State Route 676 (SR 676) is a  long east–west state highway in the southeastern portion of the U.S. state of Ohio. Its eastern terminus is at a T-intersection with SR 7 in the southwestern portion of the city of Marietta.

Route description
SR 676 traverses the western portion of Washington County and a small portion of southern Morgan County.  There are no segments of SR 676 that are a part of the National Highway System (NHS), a network of route determined to be most important for the economy, mobility and defense of the country.

History
The SR 676 designation was established in 1937.  It has utilized the same routing between SR 555 near Chesterhill and SR 7 near Marietta throughout its history.  Initially, the entire length of SR 676 was a gravel roadway.  In 1947, the easternmost stretch of SR 676 between County Road 183 (CR 183) and SR 7 was paved.  Four years later, the highway was hard-surfaced between the present SR 339 junction, at the time designated as SR 76, and CR 183.  The remaining gravel portion of SR 676 between SR 555 and the current SR 339 intersection was paved by 1961.

Major intersections

References

676
676
676